Catarina, sometimes Caterina, Zenab (1848–1921) was a Sudanese Catholic missionary.

A member of the Dinka people, born in a Dinka village, Zenab studied at the Holy Cross Mission before traveling with Daniele Comboni to Khartoum in 1860. Fluent in Dinka and Arabic, she assisted the missionaries in developing a dictionary and grammar of the Dinka language. She traveled to Verona to study before returning to Khartoum in 1873 to teach in the mission schools. Zenab spent her entire career as a missionary in Khartoum, Cairo, and Omdurman, evangelizing among the Dinka, many of whom were enslaved in those cities. She has been called "perhaps the first Christian Dinka evangelist".

References

1848 births
1921 deaths
Sudanese Roman Catholics
Converts to Roman Catholicism
Sudanese women
19th-century translators
Dinka people
Roman Catholic missionaries in Africa
Missionary linguists